Charles A. Fowler (May 10, 1832 – February 7, 1896) was an American lawyer and politician from New York.

Life 
Fowler was born on May 10, 1832 in Cold Spring, New York.

Fowler attended the American Seminary in Dutchess County. When he was 16, he entered Yale College. He had to drop out in 1851, a year before he would have graduated, due to poor health. He then studied law under Azor Tabor in Albany and studied at Albany Law School. He was a member of the first class of the school, became the oldest living graduate by the time he died, and served as president of the Alumni Association in 1885. In 1853, a day before his 21st birthday, he was admitted to the bar. He then practiced law in Chicago, Illinois for the next few years. In 1859, he opened a law office in New York City and formed a partnership with Alfred Conkling. In 1864, he moved to Ellenville and opened a successful law practice there.

Fowler served as Surrogate of Ulster County from 1868 to 1872. In 1879, he was elected to the New York State Senate as a Democrat, representing New York's 14th State Senate district (Ulster, Schoharie, and Greene Counties). He served in the Senate in 1880 and 1881. At some point prior to his election to the Senate, he moved to Kingston.

Fowler was a member, vestryman, and warden of St. John's Episcopal Church. In 1853, he married Hannah M. Warren, daughter of Cornelius Warren. They had two surviving sons, Cornelius W. and Everett. Everett worked as a law partner with his father for several years under the firm name C. A. & E. Fowler.

Fowler died in Dr. C. O. Sahler's sanitarium in Kingston, where he was for some time, on February 7, 1896. He was buried in Wiltwyck Cemetery in Kingston.

References

External links 

 The Political Graveyard
 Charles A. Fowler at Find a Grave

1832 births
1896 deaths
People from Cold Spring, New York
Yale College alumni
Albany Law School alumni
19th-century American lawyers
Lawyers from Chicago
Lawyers from New York City
People from Ellenville, New York
Politicians from Kingston, New York
19th-century American politicians
Democratic Party New York (state) state senators
19th-century American Episcopalians
Burials in Ulster County, New York